Illerwinkel is a Verwaltungsgemeinschaft (federation of municipalities) in the district of Unterallgäu in Bavaria, Germany. It consists of the following municipalities:

Kronburg
Lautrach
Legau

Verwaltungsgemeinschaften in Bavaria
Unterallgäu